Gianfranco Funari (21 March 1932 - 12 July 2008) was an Italian TV host, writer, stand-up comedian and actor.

Biography 
Funari was born in Rome, where his father was a coachman. After working as a croupier in casinos in Hong Kong and Saint Vincent, he was introduced to stand-up comedy by actor Oreste Lionello, who had spotted him doing an amateur performance in a Roman nightclub. Funari then specialized in satirical monologues, and in 1970 he made his television debut in the RAI variety show La domenica è un'altra cosa.

In 1980 Funari debuted as TV host and writer with the Telemontecarlo program Torti in faccia. In 1981 he created the successful political talk show Aboccaperta, which was first broadcast on Telemontecarlo and from 1984 to 1987 on Rai 2. Other television shows he wrote and hosted also include Mezzogiorno è (Rai 2, 1987–90), Mezzogiorno italiano  (Italia 1, 1991), Zona Franca (a TV show he hosted on a network on 75 local TV station following a series of disagreements over his political freedom with Mediaset, 1992); Funari news (Rete 4, 1993-4), Napoli capitale (Rai 2, 1995-6), A tu per tu (Canale 5, 2000) and the Saturday night show Apocalypse Show (Rai 1, 2007).

In 1994 Funari was invited to edit the newspaper  where he also worked as a columnist. He was also a television critic for the magazine Il Borghese.

Funari died on July 12, 2008 at the San Raffaele Hospital in Milan, where he was hospitalized for five months for lung  and  heart problems.

Further reading
 Gianfranco Funari. Il potere in mutande: il dito nell'occhio della TV italiana, Rizzoli, 2009. .
 Massimo Emanuelli. Gianfranco Funari. Il "giornalaio" più famoso d'Italia, Greco & Greco, 2009. .

References

External links 
 
  

1944 births
2008 deaths
Mass media people from Rome
Italian television presenters
Italian stand-up comedians
Italian male comedians
Italian male film actors
Italian television writers
Italian newspaper editors
Italian male journalists
20th-century Italian comedians
Male television writers
20th-century Italian journalists
20th-century Italian screenwriters
20th-century Italian male writers
Deaths from lung disease